Al Shaw may refer to:

Al Shaw (catcher) (1873–1958), American baseball player
Al Shaw (outfielder) (1881–1974), American baseball player

See also
Alfred Shaw (disambiguation)
Albert Shaw (disambiguation)
Alan Shaw (disambiguation)